Juan Francisco Heredia Marín (born 8 July 1989) is a Spanish former professional footballer who played for Lorca Deportiva and Lorca Atlético, as a midfielder.

References

1989 births
Living people
Spanish footballers
Lorca Deportiva CF footballers
Lorca Atlético CF players
Segunda División players
Segunda División B players
Association football midfielders